Morvant Caledonia United (formerly known as Caledonia AIA) is a professional football team in Trinidad and Tobago's top-level TT Pro League. It is based in Morvant; its home stadium is Hasely Crawford Stadium.

History
The Caledonia AIA Football Club was founded in May 1979 by a group of schoolboys from the Morvant, Laventille, San Juan and Barataria environs; one of whom included current owner Jamaal Shabazz. The Club has a franchise in the TT Pro League and runs a full professional team; employing 28 players and 7 staff on a full-time basis. Apart from the professional team the Club runs a Youth Academy and Youth teams in Under 14, Under 16 and Under 18 age groups, catering for over just over one hundred children at a recreational level. Caledonia AIA was crowned Caribbean Club Champions in 2012 and represented the Caribbean in the CONCACAF Champions League.

Club honours

Domestic
FA Trophy
Winners (3): 2008, 2011–12, 2012–13
Runners-up (1): 2007

First Citizens Cup
Winners (2): 2011, 2012
Runners-up (2): 2001, 2007

Digicel Pro Bowl
Winners (1): 2008
Runners-up (2): 2009, 2012

Lucozade Sport Goal Shield
Winners (1): 2012

Continental
CFU Club Championship
Winners (1): 2012
Runners-up (1): 1998

Current squad
Squad for the 2019-20 TT Pro League

Staff
Technical Director: Jamaal Shabazz
Head Coach: Jerry Moe
Assistant Coach/Youth Academy Director: Rajesh Latchoo
Assistant Coach: Abdallah Phillips
Goalkeeper Coach: Steve Frederick
Physio: Jason Pilgrim

References

External links
 Official Site

Football clubs in Trinidad and Tobago
Association football clubs established in 1979
1979 establishments in Trinidad and Tobago